The Entropy Exhibition: Michael Moorcock and the British 'New Wave' in Science Fiction is a book by Colin Greenland published in 1983.

Contents
The Entropy Exhibition: Michael Moorcock and the British 'New Wave' in Science Fiction is a critical study of New Worlds during the Michael Moorcock era.

Reception
Dave Pringle reviewed The Entropy Exhibition: Michael Moorcock and the British 'New Wave' in Science Fiction for Imagine magazine, and stated that "The author, still in his 20s, is obviously too young to have read NW in the 60s, but he has imagined the excitement of the period remarkably well. An important book, on an important subject."

Reviews
Review by Dan Chow (1983) in Locus, #271 August 1983
Review by John Clute (1983) in Interzone, #5 Autumn 1983
Review by Patrick Parrinder (1983) in Foundation, #29 November 1983
Review by Paul Brazier (1984) in Vector 120

References

Science fiction books